The phrase Mid-American Conference basketball tournament may refer to:

Mid-American Conference men's basketball tournament
Mid-American Conference women's basketball tournament